Carole Poirier (born October 2, 1958) is a Canadian politician. Poirier was elected to represent the Hochelaga-Maisonneuve district in the National Assembly of Quebec in the 2008 provincial election. She is a member of the Parti Québécois (PQ).

Poirier is a graduate from the Université du Québec à Montréal with certificates in administration, municipal services management and public services administration. She also obtained a master's degree in public administration from the École nationale d'administration publique.

From 1997 to 2006, she was the cabinet director for the Minister of employment and social solidarity (1997–1998), the Minister of Municipal Affairs and Metropolitan (1998–2002), the President of the National Assembly of Quebec (2002–2003) and the leader of the official opposition (2005–2006). She was also the treasurer and political organizer for the PQ's Hochelaga-Maisonneuve office.

She was defeated in the 2018 election.

Electoral record

External links
 
 Parti Quebecois biopage 

1958 births
French Quebecers
Living people
Parti Québécois MNAs
Politicians from Montreal
People from Mercier–Hochelaga-Maisonneuve
Université du Québec à Montréal alumni
Women MNAs in Quebec
Vice Presidents of the National Assembly of Quebec
21st-century Canadian politicians
21st-century Canadian women politicians